Caloreas caliginosa is a moth in the family Choreutidae. It was described by Annette Frances Braun in 1921. It is found in North America.

References

Choreutidae
Moths described in 1921